Falstaff is a Shakespearean character in the Henry IV plays and in The Merry Wives of Windsor.

Falstaff or Fallstaff may also refer to:

Music 
 Falstaff (opera), an opera by Giuseppe Verdi
 Falstaff (Balfe), an opera by Michael William Balfe
 Falstaff (Salieri) an opera by Antonio Salieri
 Falstaff (Elgar), a symphonic study by Edward Elgar

Other uses 
 Falstaff (rocket), a British hypersonic research rocket
 Fallstaff, Baltimore, Maryland, a neighborhood in the United States
 Falstaff Beer, a brand of American Beer
 Falstaff Brewing Company
 Chimes at Midnight or Falstaff, a film by Orson Welles
 Falstaff, an apple cultivar
 Falstaff Openshaw, a character from The Fred Allen Show played by Alan Reed

See also
 "Falstaff, fakir", a pseudonym of Swedish author Axel Wallengren